John Carlin was an English first-class cricketer and Test umpire . Born in Nottinghamshire in 1861, he played 76 first-class matches for Nottinghamshire as a wicket keeper and left-handed batsman between 1887 and 1901. He took 101 catches, completed 39 stumpings and scored 1577 runs with a best of 85. He also took 5 wickets. He umpired 4 test matches between 1905 and 1909 in England, standing in three Ashes tests and one featuring South Africa. He died in Mansfield in 1944.

1861 births
1944 deaths
English cricketers
Nottinghamshire cricketers
English Test cricket umpires
Marylebone Cricket Club cricketers
North v South cricketers
C. I. Thornton's XI cricketers